Holy Cross High School is a Catholic secondary school founded in Waterbury, Connecticut, in 1968 by the Congregation of Holy Cross. It is the largest Catholic secondary school in Connecticut, situated on thirty-seven acres in the West End of Waterbury, Connecticut, accessible via Route 8 and I-84.  It is not part of the Roman Catholic Archdiocese of Hartford.

Holy Cross has a total enrollment of 500 students, in four grades, with each grade averaging 125 students. Originally an all-boys institution, it became co-educational in 1975 when it merged with the Waterbury Catholic High School, an all-girls school. The Holy Cross High School campus maintains a campus-wide WiFi signal; a computer-equipped, Internet-connected library; a large instrumental and choral music room with adjacent practice rooms; science labs; a  multi-million dollar, state-of-the-art foreign language lab; a guidance complex; a 750-seat tiered auditorium; a full-service cafeteria; a gymnasium; the Stephen J. Ross Fitness Center; and state-of-the-art digital classrooms and art studios in the recently constructed two-million-dollar Alex Family Gallery Art and Technology Center.

Origins 
In September 1966, Archbishop Henry J. O'Brien announced that an all-boys Roman Catholic high school in Waterbury was scheduled to open in September 1968.  The original plans were designed to accommodate 1,200 students, parking for 400 cars, and facilities for an extensive physical education program. 

On May 5, 1967, Holy Cross High School held its groundbreaking ceremony.  The Brothers of Holy Cross agreed to staff the new facility.  Brother Robert Fontaine coordinated the opening of the new high school, eventually serving as its first guidance counselor.  The first entrance exam was administered on February 24, 1968.  Through the school's recruitment efforts, 325 students were scheduled to begin their studies at Holy Cross High School. The staff, headed by first Principal Brother Patrick Halpin, numbered ten.  Plans called for eight classrooms and a residence for the Brothers to be completed by September 1, 1968.

However, progress was hampered by a work-strike in the steel metal trades.  As a result of the delays in its completion, the new school resorted to using classrooms at a nearby school, Waterbury Catholic High School, in the late afternoon and early evening.  After Waterbury Catholic High School closed its doors in the afternoon each day, Holy Cross High School would begin its school day.  On October 7, 1968, Holy Cross High School officially opened its doors at the newly-built facility.  At that time, the school's annual tuition rate was $290.  The school's founding faculty in 1968 included, among others, Brother John McGovern, the first band director of the school, who later became Academic Vice Principal in 1972, before leaving for New York to lead Holy Cross High School in Flushing.  In 1989, McGovern returned to the Connecticut area to become Superintendent of Schools for the Archdiocese of Hartford. 

Holy Cross High School graduated its first class in 1972.

Admission 
Admission to the school is competitive, requiring a 3.5 hour placement test, a transcript from the applicant's grammar school, a letter of recommendation, and an essay.

Holy Cross scholarships and financial aid to those that qualify. Applicants may be eligible for merit scholarships if they score within the top 10%.  Scholarships are usually renewable yearly. Once admitted, students have the opportunity to take proficiency tests in mathematics and/or foreign language to advance their freshman year placing (Ex. A student may take the Spanish proficiency exam to place him/herself out of Spanish 1 CP and into Spanish 2 Honors or even Spanish 3 Honors). Financial aid is also given to those in need in the form of grants. Holy Cross also has an installment program so that parents can pay tuition in increments over the academic year.

Faculty and accreditation 
The Brothers of Holy Cross, Eastern Province, continue Basil Moreau's vision through sponsorship and staffing of the school, in association with the Sisters of the Congregation of Notre Dame and many dedicated lay men and women, most of whom hold advanced degrees and/or certificates of advanced study.

Holy Cross High School is accredited by the New England Association of Schools and Colleges, and meets Connecticut certification standards.
 The school belongs to the National Catholic Education Association and the Connecticut Association of Schools.

Athletics 
  Holy Cross is a member of the Naugatuck Valley League and the Connecticut Interscholastic Athletic Council. The Holy Cross athletic program is respected statewide for its competitiveness and the positive attitudes and good sportsmanship of its players and coaches. The Crusaders have a history of success as evidenced by the many awards, acknowledgments, and trophies displayed throughout the building. The Crusaders compete in twenty-two varsity sports for boys and girls. In 2011, the Crusaders began its lacrosse program at the JV level.  

Holy Cross High School's sports teams are as follows:

 Boys and Girls Soccer
 Boys and Girls Cross Country
 Football
 Girls Volleyball
 Girls Swimming and Diving
 Boys and Girls Indoor Track
 Boys and Girls Basketball
 Boys Swimming and Diving
 Boys Wrestling
 Baseball
 Softball
 Boys and Girls Track and Field
 Boys and Girls Tennis
 Golf
 Boys Lacrosse
 Cheerleading (2020 Class S State champions)

Along with these sports, Holy Cross also has intramural basketball, bowling, ultimate Frisbee, and bocce.

Football 
Holy Cross High School is well known in Connecticut for its football program. In 2006, the team won the first football state championship in the school's history, the Class SS State Championship, defeating Stratford 40–0. They were ranked third among all teams in the state, following Greenwich and Ansonia. In 2011 the Crusaders earned their second state championship with a 34–27 win over Cromwell in the Class S State Championship. The 12-2 Crusaders suffered only two defeats that season, both to Ansonia, the Class M State Champion. They finished ranked eighth in the state.

Swimming and diving 
The swimming and diving team is a co-ed athletic team that is respected throughout the NVL and the state. In 2019, the team won their first state championship with 709 points, defeating Brookfield High School which had 542.5 points. The 2018–2019 season was also notable because they only had one loss to Pomperaug High School during the Winter Invitational, finishing second. After cancellations in 2020 and 2021, the Crusaders defended their state title in a win over runner-up, Woodland Regional High School, 546-541.5.

"Crusader Cru" 
Starting in 2010, the "Crusader Crazies" changed their title to the Crusader Cru. The loyal fans of Holy Cross' basketball and football programs travel around the state to turn any game into a 'home' atmosphere for the teams. The Crusader Cru is also infamous in the state for The Pit, which is the name given to the Holy Cross High School basketball court by reporters around the state. The Pit is routinely ranked among the loudest and most intimidating venues in the state to play in.

Student activities 
Holy Cross student activities are open to all students. Student activities offer the opportunity to explore lessons presented in class, learn new skills and develop leadership ability. More than thirty co-curricular organizations exist in conjunction with a well-respected student government. The student government at Holy Cross includes an executive board made of four elected class officers from each class, a liaison from the Presidents' Council, a liaison from the Athletic Council, and seven members of the Senior Life Board appointed by the institution's administration. The Student Government also consists of the Presidents' Council, which is made up of the president from every club at Holy Cross and the Athletic Council, which contains various members of the school's many athletic teams. This large student government is headed by one Student Government President who is elected at the end of his or her junior year by that year's executive board to preside over the following year.

Community service is a major component of every club and committee's activities. Some projects are school-wide while others are particular to the organization. Holy Cross has a history of strong student leadership and community service as evidenced by their recognition as a State of Connecticut Gold Council of Excellence recipient and as a National Gold Council of Excellence designee.

Notable alumni 

 Allie DiMeco, actor and multi-instrumentalist (The Naked Brothers Band)
 David Gravel, sprint car racing driver
 Tony Hanson, Class of 1973, UConn Husky of Honor
 Michael Mallory, professional basketball player
 Dylan McDermott, actor (American Horror Story)
 Michael Puma, Class of 1988, sportswriter (New York Post)
 John G. Rowland, Class of 1975, Governor of the State of Connecticut (19952004)

References

External links 
 
 Roman Catholic Archdiocese of Hartford

Schools in Waterbury, Connecticut
Educational institutions established in 1968
Catholic secondary schools in Connecticut
Holy Cross secondary schools